Sameodes abstrusalis is a moth in the family Crambidae. It is found in India and Japan.

References

Moths described in 1888
Spilomelinae